Sossano is a town and comune in the province of Vicenza, Veneto,  north-easternItaly. Via Circonvallazione goes through the town.
 
The comune of Sossano borders on Agugliaro, Albettone, Campiglia dei Berici, Noventa Vicentina, Orgiano, Poiana Maggiore, San Germano dei Berici and Villaga.

References

Cities and towns in Veneto